Frederick William Schneider III (born July 1, 1951) is an American singer, songwriter, arranger, and musician, best known as frontman of the rock band the B-52's, of which he is a founding member.

Schneider is well known for his sprechgesang, which he developed from reciting poetry over guitars.

Early life
Frederick William Schneider III was born on July 1, 1951, in Newark, New Jersey, and lived in Oceanport, New Jersey after moving there from Belleville, New Jersey. He has said that his musical influences included "Halloween songs and nutty Christmas songs", along with Motown. After graduating from Shore Regional High School, he attended the University of Georgia, where he wrote a book of poetry for a class project. After college, he was a janitor as well as a Meals on Wheels driver. At the time the B-52's formed, he had very little musical experience.

The B-52's
The B-52's got their start in 1976 when founders Cindy Wilson, Ricky Wilson, Kate Pierson, Keith Strickland, and Schneider played an impromptu number after drinking at a Chinese restaurant in Athens, Georgia. The band played their first real gig in 1977 at a Valentine's Day party for their friends.

The band's first single was "Rock Lobster" which was recorded for DB Records in 1978. It was an underground success, and sold over 20,000 copies in total. In 1979, the B-52's signed a recording contract with Warner Bros. Records for South America, North America, Australia, and New Zealand. They also signed with Island Records for Europe and Asia. After the death of Ricky Wilson in 1985, the band went on hiatus. They reformed in 1989 and went on to mainstream success.

Other music ventures
Schneider has released two solo albums: Fred Schneider and the Shake Society (1984) and Just Fred (1996). He also worked on a side project called the Superions. The group released a self-titled EP and the album Destination... Christmas! in 2010. In February 2011, the band announced they were working on a full-length album which was eventually released in 2017 under the title The Vertical Mind.

Radio
Until late 2008, Schneider hosted a show called Party Out of Bounds that aired on Friday nights, 9pm to 12am (ET) on Sirius 33 First Wave. On the show, Schneider played a mix of new wave-era dance, remixes and rarities, interspersed with anecdotes and humor.

Personal life
, Schneider was living on Long Island, New York.

On the February 22, 2010 broadcast of The Howard Stern Show, Schneider discussed his experience of coming out as gay to his mother. Schneider said that his mother always knew more about him than he knew about himself, and that he came out of the closet while she was vacuum-cleaning. His mother replied, "Oh I know, Freddie", and continued vacuuming. Schneider's reaction was, "It's like, well, OK. I guess I'll go back outside and smoke some pot."

Schneider is a lifelong vegetarian and in 2014 appeared in a PETA ad campaign discouraging people from eating lobsters.

Discography

Studio albums
Fred Schneider and the Shake Society (1984)
Just Fred (1996)

Collaborations
Schneider is featured on the track "Mr. Used-To-Be" on Richard Barone's 1990 album, Primal Dream (MCA). Barone co-wrote and arranged on Just Fred, and produced Schneider's version of Harry Nilsson's "Coconut" from the Nilsson tribute album For the Love of Harry. Schneider co-wrote and sang on Barone's Don't Open 'Til Doomsday on COLLECTION: An Embarrassment of Richard in 2004.
He was a guest vocalist on the song "The Power of Pussy" on Bongwater's 1990 album of the same name.
He worked with Captain Planet on the "Eco Rap", an updated theme song used for The New Adventures of Captain Planet.
Fred Schneider is featured on "Stinky Dinky", track 9 of RuPaul's 1993 debut album, Supermodel of the World.
The 1994-produced track "Do the Funky Something" by Godchildren of Soul features Fred Schneider and could be found on the GOS album Anyone Can Join and on the Rufus Thomas compilation Do the Funky Somethin'''.
The 1994 compilation Elvira Presents Monster Hits features the track "Here Comes the Bride (The Bride of Frankenstein)", sung by Elvira. Schneider sings guest vocals and co-wrote the song.
Possum Dixon's 1998 album New Sheets has the song "Firecracker" written by Schneider.
The soundtrack for The Rugrats Movie, released in 1998, contains the track "The World is Something New to Me" and features Schneider, Pierson, and Wilson along with other artists.
He was a guest vocalist on the track "National Anthem of Love" on Joe McIntyre's album Meet Joe Mac (2001).
He provided the vocals for the Foo Fighters cover of "Planet Claire", released as a bonus track on the FF's single "Times Like These" (2003).
The compilation album Wig in a Box – The Songs From Hedwig and the Angry Inch, released in 2003, features the collaboration of Sleater-Kinney and Schneider on the title "Angry Inch".
The 2004 release of the compilation album Trekkies 2 features his collaboration with B-52's part-time keyboarder Pat Irwin "Beam Me Up"
He worked with Sophie Ellis-Bextor on some songs for her album Trip the Light Fantastic. The song "Supersonic", on which he worked and for which he provided vocals, appeared on the UK and Australian versions of her album in 2007.
Tiny Masters of Today released the album Bang Bang Boom Cake in 2007 and Schneider is featured on the kid's song "Disco Bomb".
Schneider provided guest vocals on Deni Bonet's 2010 single "Girl Party". The track can also be found on the album It's All Good, released in 2013. The album was produced by Richard Barone, an artist Schneider and Kate Pierson had previously collaborated with.
Fred Schneider appears on the Ursula 1000 song "Hey You!" from the album Mondo Beyondo. Schneider and 1000 later formed a one-off project called The Fangs, who released a song called "Vampire Vamp" for Halloween 2012.
Schneider appears on two titles of the album The Inevitable Album by the artist "Jinkx Monsoon". The tracks "The Ladies in Drag" and "The Bacon Shake" are only available as a download, like the whole album. Released in 2014. He also appears on a title of Jinkx Monsoon's album The Ginger Snapped entitled "She Evil", released in 2018.
Elvira released a 7-inch single, "2 Big Pumpkins / 13 Nights Of Halloween", in the US for Halloween 2014. Both tracks are co-written by Schneider.
Schneider sang with Mini Mansions on "Cheap Leather", the B-side of their 2015 single "Vertigo".

Other works
FilmOne Trick Pony (1980)Athens, GA: Inside/Out (1987)Funny (1989)A Matter of Degrees (1990)The Flintstones (1994)The Rugrats Movie (1998, voice only)Desert Blue (1998, voice only)Godass (2000)Each Time I Kill (2002)Trekkies 2 (2004)

Television
He is credited alongside Kate Pierson for singing the theme song to the Nickelodeon cartoon Rocko's Modern Life (1992).
He was a guest in an episode of Space Ghost Coast to Coast in 1997.
He appeared in an episode of The L Word in 2006.
He guest-starred in an episode of Lil' Bush in 2008.
He appeared in an episode of The Daily Show on June 2, 2008.
He briefly sang a line in an episode of The Cleveland Show in 2011 (voice only).

Books
In 1975–76, Schneider hand-wrote approximately 100 copies of a short book of his poems entitled Bleb. The book included a poem called "There's a Moon in the Sky (Called the Moon)", which later appeared as a song on the B-52's 1979 debut album.
In 1987, Schneider wrote a paperback book of mostly poetry entitled Fred Schneider and Other Unrelated Works, which was published by Arbor House, New York. The book is approximately 96 pages and out of print. The book was a compilation of new material and reprinted poems from his independent release Bleb, with illustrations by Kenny Scharf, who also designed the cover art for the B-52's' 1986 album Bouncing Off the Satellites''. Approximately 6,000 copies were printed.

References

External links

1951 births
20th-century American singers
21st-century American singers
American male singers
American new wave musicians
American rock singers
American gay musicians
American LGBT singers
Living people
Musicians from Newark, New Jersey
People from Belleville, New Jersey
People from Long Branch, New Jersey
Songwriters from New Jersey
The B-52's members
LGBT people from New Jersey
Male new wave singers
American post-punk musicians
20th-century American LGBT people
21st-century American LGBT people
American male rappers